Sayf ibn Umar al-Usayyidi al-Tamimi was an 8th-century Islamic historian and compiler of reports who lived in Kufa. It also contains important information on the structure of early Muslim armies and government. According to al-Dhahabi, Sayf died during the reign of Harun al-Rashid (786–809).

Life 

Little is known about Sayf, except that he lived in Kufa and belonged to the tribe of Banu Tamim.

Reliability 

The reliability of his hadiths has long been contested.

Since he was the sole transmitter of many of his historical narrations, especially pertaining to the conquest of Iraq, some historians have accused him of fabrication or exaggeration, most notably Julius Wellhausen. His narrations are said to be influenced by the tribal traditions of Banu Tamim. However, he also collected accounts that highlight other tribes.

Recent scholarship suggests that Sayf is more reliable than previously thought. W. F. Tucker and Ella Landau-Tasseron note that although Sayf may have been an unscrupulous hadith collector, this should not detract from his general reliability as a transmitter of historical information (akhbārī). Tucker adds that accusations of bias could equally be leveled at other akhbārīs contemporary to Sayf, including the Shi'a historian Abu Mikhnaf. Fuat Sezgin, Albrecht Noth, and Martin Hinds have also challenged Wellhausen's views and placed Sayf on an equal footing with other traditionalists.

Notes

Further reading 
 
 

Banu Tamim
Year of death unknown
Year of birth unknown
8th-century historians from the Abbasid Caliphate
8th-century Arabic writers